Oussekine is a French historical drama series directed by Antoine Chevrollier. The series was marketed as the third French Disney+ original production and was released in its entirety on May 11, 2022 on Disney+, consisting of 4 episodes. Set primarily in 1980s Paris, the series follows the events leading up to and following the death of Malik Oussekine.

Premise 
Oussekine looks back on the events of December 5, 1986 which led to the assassination of Malik Oussekine, a young 22-year-old french-algerian student, by police. The story and the trial are told across the Oussekine family.

Cast and characters 

 Kad Merad as Georges Kiejman
 Sayyid El Alami as Malik Oussekine
 Hiam Abbass as Aïcha Oussekine
 Naidra Ayadi as Fatna Oussekine
 Tewfik Jallab as Mohamed Oussekine
 Malek Lamraoui as Ben Amar Oussekine
 Mouna Soualem as Sarah Oussekine
 Slimane Dazi as Miloud Oussekine
 Thierry Godard as Jean Schmidt
 Laurent Stocker as Bernard Dartevelle
 Olivier Gourmet as Robert Pandraud
 Bastien Bouillon as Yann
 Gilles Cohen as Maître Garaud
 Mario Hacquard as François Mitterrand
 Louis Berthélémy as Paul Bayzelon
 Théau Courtès as Agent Pierre

Release 
The series launched in France and other international markets on May 11, 2022 on Disney+ as an original series through the Star content hub. In Latin America, Oussekine was released as an original series through Star+.

Reception 
According to French entertainment website AlloCiné, the series received widespread praise in French media. Thibaud Gomès-Léal of CNet France described it as "one of the best French series of 2022," praising Antoine Chevrollier's direction and the performances of the actors. Thomas Sotinel of Le Monde described it as "a mirror held up to France, through time," stating it scrupulously explores the circumstances and consequences of the death of Malik Oussekine. Pierre Langlais of Télérama described it as a "perfect example of an educational, moving, well-documented and engaging series of general interest." Olivier Lamm of Libération stated the series unveils the consequences of Malik Oussekine's death and political ramifications, calling the series "excellent, complex and committed."

Salammbô Marie of Numérama rated the series 10 out of 10, stated the series manages to tell the story of Malik Oussekine faithfull, called the storytelling "captivating" and "full of empathy," and applauded the performances of the cast. Dan Einav of Financial Times rated the series 4 out of 5 stars, writing, "The story it tells about brutal, bigoted law enforcement, xenophobia and nativism is, sadly, as timely as ever," and describing it as "[going] for the heart as well as the gut."

References

2022 French television series debuts
2022 French television series endings
Star (Disney+) original programming